The 2002–03 Iranian Premiere Futsal League was the 5th season of the Iran Pro League. The league will also be composed of 12 teams.

Teams

Awards 

 Winner: Pas
 Runners-up: Esteghlal
 Third-Place: Shensa
 Top scorer: ??

External links 
 Futsal Planet 

1
futsal